Maryna Zanevska was the defending champion but withdrew from the tournament.

Jasmine Paolini won the title, defeating Kateryna Baindl in the final, 6–4, 6–4.

Seeds

Draw

Finals

Top half

Bottom half

References

External Links
Main Draw

Torneig Internacional Els Gorchs - Singles